The Deoghar–Agartala Weekly Express is an Express train belonging to Northeast Frontier Railway zone that runs between Deoghar Junction in Jharkhand, India and Agartala in Tripura, India. It is currently being operated with 15625/15626 train numbers on a weekly basis.

Service

The 15625/Deoghar–Agartala Weekly Express has an average speed of 40 km/hr and covers 1474 km in 34hrs 15min. The 15626/Agartala–Deoghar Weekly Express has an average speed of 39 km/hr and covers 1474 km in 36h 00min.

Route and halts 

The important halts of the train are:

JHARKHAND (Starts)
 

BIHAR
 
 
 
 
 
 

WEST BENGAL
New Jalpaiguri (Siliguri)
 

ASSAM
 
 
 
 
 
 
 
 

TRIPURA
 
 
  (Ends)

Coach composition

The train has standard ICF rakes with a max speed of 110 kmph. The train consists of 14 coaches:

 2 AC III Tier
 7 Sleeper coaches
 3 General Unreserved
 2 Seating cum Luggage Rake

Traction

Direction reversal

The train reverses its direction one times:

See also 

 Deoghar Junction railway station
 Sealdah railway station
 Sealdah–Silchar Kanchenjunga Express
 Kanchenjunga Express

Notes

References

External links 

 15625/Deoghar - Agartala Weekly Express India Rail Info
 15626/Agartala - Deoghar Weekly Express India Rail Info

Transport in Deoghar
Transport in Agartala
Express trains in India
Rail transport in West Bengal
Rail transport in Jharkhand
Rail transport in Bihar
Rail transport in Assam
Rail transport in Tripura
Railway services introduced in 2018